Ahmet Örken (born 12 March 1993) is a Turkish professional cyclist, who currently rides for UCI Continental team .

Career
Born in Çumra, Konya Province, Örken began with cycling sport at the age of fourteen in 2007 at Çumra, Konya Province, where he moved from his village with his mother to enable his older brother's education there. The next year, he entered the cycling team at Çatalhöyük Çumra Municipality Sports Club with the help of his brother.

He became the first ever European cycling champion from Turkey with his win at the 2011 European Track Championships in the junior omnium held in Portugal.

In 2013, Ahmet Örken won the sixth stage of the Tour du Maroc, between Meknes and Khenifra, despite injuries he suffered during a fall in a mass crash after . He finished third in stage eight, between Beni Mellal and Marrakesh. Örken won the fourth (Kladovo to Požarevac) and sixth (Sremska Mitrovica to Belgrade) stages of the Tour de Serbie in 2013.

Örken had signed to join ProContinental team  from 2018, but at a time of heightened tensions in the Middle East, he pulled out of the agreement after he and his family were put under pressure.

Major results
Source: 

2009
 Balkan Novice Road Championships
1st Road race
1st Time trial
 National Novice Road Championships
1st  Road race
1st  Time trial
2010
 National Junior Road Championships
1st  Road race
1st  Time trial
 1st Prix des Vins Valloton Juniors
2011
 1st  Omnium, UEC European Junior Track Championships
2013
 Tour de Serbie
1st Stages 4 & 6
 1st Stage 6 Tour du Maroc
 6th Tour of Nanjing
2014
 1st  Time trial, National Road Championships
 1st Stage 9 Tour of Qinghai Lake
 9th Overall Tour of Taihu Lake
2015
 1st  Time trial, National Road Championships
 1st Overall International Tour of Torku Mevlana
1st Sprints classification
1st Prologue, Stages 2 & 3
 1st Overall Tour of Aegean
1st Prologue & Stage 1
 1st Stage 2 Tour du Maroc
 1st Stage 3 Tour of Black Sea
 3rd Overall Tour of Ankara
1st Mountains classification
 7th Overall Tour of Taihu Lake
2016
 National Road Championships
1st  Time trial
2nd Road race
2017
 National Road Championships
1st  Time trial
3rd Road race
 1st Overall North-Cyprus Presidential Cycling Tour
1st Stages 1, 3 & 4
 Les Challenges de la Marche Verte
1st GP Al Massira
3rd GP Oued Eddahab
5th GP Sakia El Hamra
 Tour of Qinghai Lake
1st  Points classification
1st Stages 4 & 10
 1st Stage 3 Tour de Serbie
 2nd International Rhodes Grand Prix
 Challenge du Prince
4th Trophée de l'Anniversaire
4th Trophée de la Maison Royale
2018
 1st  Time trial, National Road Championships
 Tour of Mevlana
1st Prologue & Stage 4
 4th Overall Tour of Fatih Sultan Mehmet
 5th Time trial, Mediterranean Games
 7th Grand Prix Minsk
 9th Overall Tour of Cappadocia
1st  Mountains classification
1st Stage 1
 9th Grand Prix Alanya
2019
 National Road Championships
1st  Road race
1st  Time trial
 Tour of Mesopotamia
1st Points classification
1st Stage 4
 2nd Overall Tour of Mevlana
1st Stage 3
 5th Overall Tour of Black Sea
 5th Grand Prix Alanya
 6th Grand Prix Velo Erciyes
 8th Grand Prix Gazipaşa
 8th Minsk Cup
2020
 3rd Time trial, National Road Championships
 7th Overall Tour of Mevlana
2021
 National Road Championships
1st  Time trial
3rd Road race
2022
 1st  Time trial, National Road Championships
 5th Time trial, Islamic Solidarity Games
 8th Time trial, Mediterranean Games
2023
 1st Expo Kriteryum
 3rd Grand Prix Aspendos

References

External links
 

1993 births
Living people
Turkish male cyclists
People from Çumra
Olympic cyclists of Turkey
Cyclists at the 2016 Summer Olympics
Cyclists at the 2020 Summer Olympics
Competitors at the 2018 Mediterranean Games
European Games competitors for Turkey
Cyclists at the 2015 European Games
Mediterranean Games competitors for Turkey
20th-century Turkish people
21st-century Turkish people